is a Japanese footballer currently playing as a forward for Kawasaki Frontale as a designated special player.

Club career
Named as a designated special player ahead of the 2022 season, Yamada made his debut for Kawasaki Frontale in the J.League Cup against Cerezo Osaka.

Career statistics

Club
:

Notes

References

2000 births
Living people
Toin University of Yokohama alumni
Japanese footballers
Association football forwards
Kawasaki Frontale players